Richard Morris Lyman Jr. (March 15, 1893 - October 31, 1978) served in the California State Assembly for the 37th district from 1923 to 1925. During World War I he also served in the United States Army.

References

United States Army personnel of World War I
Republican Party members of the California State Assembly
1893 births
1978 deaths
Politicians from Oakland, California